Elizabeth Burns (1957–2015) was an English poet and creative writing teacher.

Early life and education
Elizabeth Burns was born on 14 December 1957, in Wisbech, Isle of Ely, Cambridgeshire. Her mother Muriel (Hayward) was from Bristol and her father, David Grieve Burns from Kirkcaldy.
Burns spent her early life in Scotland, educated at Corstorphine Primary School and Craigmount High in Edinburgh. Between 1976 and 1980 she studied English Language and Literature at the University of St. Andrews, graduating with an MA. In her twenties, living in Edinburgh, she was a leading member of the First of May Bookshop collective in Edinburgh as well as an early member of the Pomegranate women's writing group.

She spent much of her later life in Lancaster, teaching and writing, and died in August 2015 aged 57.

Poetry 
The central themes of Elizabeth Burn's work are around 'making what was invisible, visible through words and images' often delicately poised moments of home life, music, literature and art.

She published five collections of poetry as well as several pamphlets and often collaborated with other artists - potters, weaver and painters. Her work has appeared in numerous magazines and anthologies.

Spiral 
In 2015, one of her poems, Spiral, which is inspired by the motion of a potter's wheel, was reproduced on a 25 x 8 metre banner on the Royal Mile Edinburgh to mark National Poetry Day.

The poem appears in the latest collection of her poems Lightkeepers, published in 2016 by Wayleave Press and compiled after her death by friends and fellow poets, Gerrie Fellows and Jane Routh.

Published work 
 Ophelia and other Poems (Polygon) 1999
 The Gift of Light'" (diehard) 2000
 The Lantern Bearers (Shoestring Press) 2007
 Held (Polygon) 2010
 Lightkeepers (Wayleave) 2016

 Awards and recognition 
Shortlisted for the Saltire Society First Book of the Year award for Ophelia and other Poems'' 1991
Winner of the BBC Radio 3 Proms Poetry Competition 2012
Manchester Cathedral's Poet of the Year 2013
Shortlisted for the Ted Hughes Award for Clay 2016
Runner-up in the Callum Macdonald Memorial Awards for Clay 2016

References

External links 

British poets
1957 births
2015 deaths